Liberty Township is one of the thirteen townships of Clinton County, Ohio, United States. The 2010 census reported 1,067 people living in the township, 813 of whom were in the unincorporated portions.

Geography
Located in the northern part of the county, it borders the following townships:
Jefferson Township, Greene County - northeast
Wilson Township - east
Union Township - south
Chester Township - west
Caesarscreek Township, Greene County - northwest

It is located in the north central part of the county on the Greene County line about halfway between Wilmington and Xenia.

The entire township lies in the Virginia Military District.

The village of Port William is located in northern Liberty Township.

Transportation
Major roads in Liberty Township include Interstate 71, U.S. Route 68, and State Route 134.

Name and history
Liberty Township was organized in 1817.

It is one of twenty-five Liberty Townships statewide.

In 1833, Liberty Township contained a flouring mill, two saw mills, a fulling mill, a distillery, and one store.

Government
The township is governed by a three-member board of trustees, who are elected in November of odd-numbered years to a four-year term beginning on the following January 1. Two are elected in the year after the presidential election and one is elected in the year before it. There is also an elected township fiscal officer, who serves a four-year term beginning on April 1 of the year after the election, which is held in November of the year before the presidential election. Vacancies in the fiscal officership or on the board of trustees are filled by the remaining trustees.

References
Clinton County Historical Society.  Clinton County, Ohio, 1982.  Wilmington, Ohio:  The Society, 1982.
Ohio Atlas & Gazetteer.  6th ed. Yarmouth, Maine:  DeLorme, 2001.  
Ohio. Secretary of State.  The Ohio municipal and township roster, 2002-2003.  Columbus, Ohio:  The Secretary, 2003.

External links
County website

Townships in Clinton County, Ohio
Townships in Ohio